Airampoa tilcarensis is a species of Airampoa found in Jujuy, Argentina.

References

External links

tilcarensis
Flora of Argentina
Cacti of South America